Massarina walkeri is a plant pathogen fungi. It attacks medicago sativa and has been found in Queensland, Australia.

References

External links 
 Index Fungorum
 USDA ARS Fungal Database

Pleosporales
Fungal plant pathogens and diseases
Fungi described in 1987